Moremela is a village in Thaba Chweu Local Municipality of Mpumalanga province, South Africa. It is the nearest settlement to Bourke's Luck Potholes, a scenic place.

References

Populated places in the Thaba Chweu Local Municipality